If You Liked School You'll Love Work is a collection of short stories from novelist Irvine Welsh. It was released in the UK on 5 July 2007, and in the U.S. on 4 September 2007.

Stories
"Rattlesnakes"—Three young Americans find themselves in dire circumstances in the desert, when one of them receives a snakebite on the genitals.
"If You Liked School You'll Love Work..."—Expatriate English publican juggles business, family and women, on the Canary Islands.
"The DOGS of Lincoln Park"—American yuppies and a Korean chef collide.
"Miss Arizona"—Struggling independent filmmaker follows in the footsteps of his hero, only to find himself much closer than he imagined.
"Kingdom of Fife"—Scottish Subbuteo player and ex-jockey, Jason King, seeks love and destiny amid a background of corruption and loss in this novella.

2007 short story collections
Short story collections by Irvine Welsh
Jonathan Cape books